Club Social y Deportivo Xelajú Mario Camposeco, commonly known as Xelajú MC or just Xela and nicknamed Superchivos is a Guatemalan professional football club competing in the Liga Nacional, the top tier of Guatemalan football. They are located in Quetzaltenango, Department of Quetzaltenango, and play their home matches in the Estadio Mario Camposeco. They are the most successful team (in terms of national titles won) not based in the capital city in the history of the league.

History
The club was founded in 1928 as Germania; after ten years of existence, their name would be changed to ADIX (Asociación Deportiva Independiente de Xelajú), and during that time the uniform colors were established as red jersey and blue shorts, a combination that remains to date. The team was renamed Xelajú Mario Camposeco in honor of local footballer Mario Camposeco who was the captain of the club in the 1940s, helped them win 10 consecutive Quetzaltenango department titles, and who was still an active player when he died in a plane crash in 1951.

The Superchivos have been Guatemalan champions five times, first in 1961–62, again in 1980, a third time in 1995–96, a fourth time in the 2006–07 season, and a fifth in 2011–12. Xelajú has won the Copa Centenario once, in 1972–73. In the 2007 Clausura tournament, they eliminated five-time defending champion Municipal in semi-finals, to reach their first final since the inception of the Apertura/Clausura format. They faced Marquense, losing the first match 0–1 and winning the second match 4–1, for an aggregate score of 4–2 which gave them their fourth championship. It was the first time since 1980 that two teams from outside of Guatemala City finished first and runner-up. The club currently has a kit deal with Guatemala-based company MR. Past kit sponsors include Joma, Lotto, Vicnar, Puma, Reto Sports and Do More.

They have a fierce rivalry with Suchitepéquez, which is known as the Clásico del Suroccidente. Their other rivals also consist of Marquense and Comunicaciones.

Crest
The club's shield is circular in shape, it has written in white letters the name of the team around the circumference, in the center it has a goat and the background is a yellow soccer ball. For each title the club gets, a Moon is added to the shield.

Supporters
Xelajú has the largest fan base outside of the capital department and have great tradition within Guatemalan football. They are considered as one of the biggest fanbases in all of Central American football. One of the most typical characteristics of the supporters is the way they sing  Luna de Xelajú, a theme considered as the anthem of Quetzaltenango.

Honours

Domestic honours

Leagues
 Liga Nacional de Guatemala and predecessors 
 Champions (5) : 1962, 1980, 1996, Clausura 2007, Clausura 2012

Cups
 Copa de Guatemala and predecessors 
 Champions (3) : 1963, 1973, 2010

Performance in international competitions
CONCACAF Champions' Cup
1997 - Second Round
UNCAF Interclub Cup
2007 - Quarterfinals
CONCACAF Champions League
2012-13 - Quarterfinals

Current squad
As of: February 15, 2022

Out on loan

Notable former players
 Sergio Anaya (FW) (1959–1966)
 Mariano Crisanto Meléndez (FW) (1995-1996)
 Mario Camposeco (FW) (1942–1951)
 Mario Castellanos (FW) (2017-2021)
 Julio Estacuy (DF) (2005-2019)
 Jhony Girón (DF) (2006-2015)
 Nestor Jucup (MF)  (2008-2019)
 Marco Pappa (MF) (2018-2019)
 Édgar Chinchilla (FW) (2011-2015)
 Jhonny Cubero (FW) (2005–2010)
 Fernando Patterson (GK) (1996–2008)
 Sergio Morales (MF) (2004–2013)
 Jorge Suárez (GK) (1981–1982)
 Mauricio Quintanilla (FW) (1979–1982)
 Israel Silva  (FW) (2004–2021)
 Juliano Rangel (DF) (2013-2016)

Managerial history

 Roberto Chávez Lozano (1961–1962)
 Aníbal Villagrán (1963)
 Asisclo Sáenz (1963–1964)
 Ferenc Meszaros (1966)
 Arnoldo Camposeco (1972–1973)
 Sergio Anaya (1978)
 Javier Mascaró (1980)
 Orlando de León (1981)
 Javier Mascaró (1991–1992)
 Marvin Rodríguez (1995–1996)
 Walter Claverí (2000)
 Camilo Aguilar (2001)
 Julio Antúnez (2001–2004)
 Edwin Pavón (2004)
 Luis da Costa (2005–2006)
 Carlos Jurado (2007)
 Gabriel Castillo (2008–2009)
 Alberto Jorge (2009–2010)
 Horacio Cordero (2010)
 Francisco Lobato (2010)
 Gustavo Adolfo Cifuentes (2010)
 Carlos Jurado (2010–2011)
 Hernán Medford (2011–2013)
 Saul Lorenzo Rivero (2013–2014)
 Hector Julian Trujillo (2013–2014)
 Carlos Jurado (2014)
 Nahúm Espinoza (2014–2015)
 Hernán Medford (2015-2016)
 Carlos Jurado	(2016)	
 Rafael Loredo (2016)
 Ronald Gómez (2016-2018)
 Walter Claverí	(2018)
 Ramiro Cepeda (2018-2019)
 Walter Horacio González (2019)
 Sergio Egea (2019-2020)
 Walter Claverí (2020)
 Marcó Antonio Morales (interim) (2020-2021)
  Gustavo Machaín (2021)
  Marcó Antonio Morales (2021)
  Irving Rubirosa (2021-2022)
  Amarini Villatoro (2022- )

References

External links

Official Website
Guatemala - List of Champions

Xelaju M.C.
Association football clubs established in 1928
1928 establishments in Guatemala
Quetzaltenango